Dokuz Dağın Efesi, or Dokuz Dağın Efesi: Çakici Geliyor is a 1958 Turkish drama film directed by Metin Erksan. It stars Fikret Hakan, Serpil Gül, and Hayri Esen.

References

External links
 
 

1958 films
Turkish drama films
1958 drama films
Films directed by Metin Erksan
1950s Turkish-language films